From the Greenhouse, is the eighth studio album by Crack the Sky, which saw the return of keyboardist Vince DePaul as well as founding members Rick Witkowski (lead guitar) and drummer Joe D'Amico (relegated to just singing back-up vocals).

Track listing

Note: song lengths listed on the CD differ slightly from the tracks' actual times

Personnel

The band
John Palumbo — Vocals, guitar, bass guitar, drums
Rick Witkowski — Lead guitar
Vince DePaul — Keyboards
Joe D'Amico — Backing vocals

Additional musicians
Dave Carrero — Guitar solo ("Lost in America")
Paul Soroka — Lyricon solos, brass
Marvin Brown — Backing vocals
Terry Brown — Backing vocals
Louis Roscar — Brass
Otis Demteen — Brass
Carla Brown — Children's choir
Dani DeCola — Children's choir
Little Vinnie DePaul — Children's choir
Jodi Diamond — Children's choir
Dawn Dilley — Children's choir
Tom Dugas — Children's choir
Dionne Easley — Children's choir
Dwan Easley — Children's choir
Jodi Jacobson — Children's choir
Chelsea Jones — Children's choir
Hanan Kabik — Children's choir
Dave Krass — Children's choir
Jessica McDermott Fahey — Children's choir
Ali Palumbo — Children's choir
Ian Palumbo — Children's choir
Laura Rayner — Children's choir
Natalie Rayner — Children's choir
Alana Sogan — Children's choir
Christopher Sogan — Children's choir
Hayley Taibel — Children's choir
Jimmy Tochterman — Children's choir
Justin Tochterman — Children's choir

Production
John Palumbo — Producer
Bob Ludwig — Mastering
Steve Palmieri — Engineer
Victor Giordano — Editing
Donald Stewart — Tape machines

Additional credits
Ross Anzalone Adcreations — Cover concept and design
Mastered at Masterdisk
Recorded and mixed at The Mainframe
Thanks: Ron Gregory, Gus Glava, Victor Giordano, Ben and Sydney Deluxe, Mark Easley, Dave Heckscher, George Hagegeorge, Mary, Mimi, Barbara, Valerie, Debbie, Lynn, Davey, Lori, and especially Victor Gregory for his belief and endurance.

Sources
CD liner notes

1989 albums
Crack the Sky albums